Bizunesh Bekele (1936 – 25 June 1990) was an Ethiopian soul singer who was popular in the 1960s and 1970s of Golden Age. She was referred to as "Aretha Franklin of Ethiopia" due to similitude of musical style. Her songs were released in her native Amharic language.

Life and career
Bizunesh Bekele was born in 1936. After joining Kebur Zabagna Band, by her friend persuasion, she hosted Tikil Radio entertainment program in 1957, became prominent in the era. In the interview with Music, Theatre, Art, Bizunesh did not released albums by 1969. Bizunesh recorded popular songs in the 1970s such as "Chenk Tibeb" and "Ayasayegn Chinkun". She sometimes performed with the Gurage singer Mahmoud Ahmed in Amharic. They were both known for appearing with the Imperial Body Guard Band or the Dahlak Banb.

She is featured on the recording Ethiopian Groove - The Golden Seventies (1994, Buda Musique).

Artistry
She has been called the "Mariam Makeba of Ethiopia" and the "First Lady of Addis Ababa".

Personal life
Bizunesh first married to Kebur Zabegna member Constable Nuru Wondeafrash, who served in the Korean War. Bizunesh was Christian while her husband was Muslim. The second marriage was from Mohammed Endris, a young journalist. In the latter life, Bizunesh suffered from health deterioration with many argued that she had hearing impairment that prevent to perform in the tour of U.S., and inability to sing after brief recovery. She died in 1990 before her second trip in U.S. for her medical follow-up.

References

1936 births
1990 deaths
20th-century Ethiopian women singers
Amharic-language singers